The list of ship launches in 1741 includes a chronological list of some ships launched in 1741.


References

1741
Ship launches